Oxyacodon is an extinct genus of condylarth of the family Periptychidae endemic to North America during the Early Paleocene living from 66 to 63.3 mya, existing for approximately .

Taxonomy
Oxyacodon was named by Osborn and Earle (1895). Its type is Oxyacodon apiculatus. It was assigned to Periptychidae by Osborn and Earle (1895) and Carroll (1988); and to Conacodontinae by Archibald (1998), Eberle (2003) and Middleton and Dewar (2004).

Fossils have been found dating back to the Puercan stage in New Mexico, Colorado, Utah, Wyoming, Montana, North Dakota and Saskatchewan.

References

Archibald, J.D., Rigby, J.K. Jr., and Robison, S.F.(1983). Systematic revision of Oxyacodon (Condylarthra, Periptychidae) and a description of O. ferronensis n. sp. Journal of Paleontology 57: 53–72.

Condylarths
Paleocene mammals of North America
Fossil taxa described in 1895
Prehistoric placental genera